Henri Anthoine (born 1 January 1878, date of death unknown) was a French racing cyclist. He finished in last place in the 1908 Tour de France.

References

External links

1878 births
Year of death missing
French male cyclists
Place of birth missing